New Horizons is an album by saxophonist Charles McPherson which was recorded in 1977 and released on the Xanadu label.

Reception

The Allmusic review awarded the album 4 stars stating "The music is typically swinging and has its exciting moments".

Track listing 
All compositions by Charles McPherson except as indicated
 "Promise" - 5:02   
 "I'll Never Stop Loving You" (Nicholas Brodszky, Sammy Cahn) - 4:17    
 "Night Eyes" - 9:38 
 "Horizons" - 5:19
 "Samba de Orfeu" (Luiz Bonfá, Antonio María) - 6:56
 "Dee Blues" - 8:13

Personnel 
Charles McPherson - alto saxophone
Mickey Tucker - piano
Cecil McBee - bass
Freddie Waits - drums

References 

Charles McPherson (musician) albums
1978 albums
Xanadu Records albums
Albums produced by Don Schlitten